The Poet Game is an album by American folk singer/guitarist Greg Brown, released in 1994.

Reception

Writing for Allmusic, music critic Richard Meyer wrote of the album "Greg Brown's latest release is somber and streetwise with more political undertones than his previous CDs... Production is simple and in a few cases one would have liked to hear a bit more thought given to the instrumental arrangement, but still this is a fine stripped-to-the-bone songwriter album by one of the premiere contemporary writers." Music critic Robert Christgau gave the album a "Neither" rating.

Track listing
All songs by Greg Brown.
 "Brand New '64 Dodge" – 3:49
 "Boomtown" – 3:17
 "Poet Game" – 5:30
 "Ballingall Hotel" – 5:42
 "One Wong Turn" – 3:46
 "Jesus and Elvis" – 3:39
 "Sadness" – 5:50
 "Lately" – 4:27
 "Lord, I Have Made You a Place in My Heart" – 4:17
 "My New Book" – 6:01
 "Driftless" – 3:06
 "Here in the Going Going Gone" – 3:48

Personnel
Greg Brown – vocals, guitar
Bo Ramsey – guitar, lap steel guitar
Gordon Johnson – bass, guitar
Robin Adnan Anders – percussion
Rob Arthur – organ
Steve Hayes – drums

Production
Produced by Bo Ramsey and Greg Brown
Engineered by Tom Tucker
Mixed by Tom Tucker, Greg Brown, Bo Ramsey
Assistant engineer - Fred Harrington

References

Greg Brown (folk musician) albums
1994 albums
Red House Records albums